Wrasse Records is a British record label based in Ashtead, Surrey.  It was started in 1998 by Ian and Jo Ashbridge. Both had been involved in the music industry prior to them starting up their own company. Its offices are based in the UK, but it distributes its CDs all around the world. In 2005, it licensed most of Universal Music's world music releases for distribution in the United States and the UK.

Wrasse Records specializes in world music, with artists such as Fela Kuti, Rachid Taha, Ismael Lo, Souad Massi, Angélique Kidjo, K'naan and Pink Martini.

Wrasse recording artist Seu Jorge appeared in the film The Life Aquatic with Steve Zissou (released November 2004), performing songs onscreen and on the official soundtrack album (released by a different label). This drew attention to Jorge and sparked sales of his coincident (September 2004) album Cru, helping to draw attention to the Wrasse label.

Humphead Records is an associated label specializing in country music.

Artists

Lineup as of 2008

 Boubacar Traoré
 Caetano Veloso
 King Sunny Adé
 Tony Allen
 Amparanoia
 Horace Andy
 Issa Bagayogo
 The Bathers
 Jorge Benjor
 Chris Berry
 Maria Bethânia
 Gregg Kofi Brown
 Chico Buarque
 Yuri Buenaventura
 Café De Los Maestros
 Café Tacuba
 Manecas Costa
 Gal Costa
 Daara J
 Vinicius De Moraes
 Wasis Diop
 Arielle Dombasle
 Lucky Dube
 Enzo Avitabile & Bottari
 Faudel
 Tiziano Ferro
 China Forbes
 Donavon Frankenreiter
 Freshlyground
 Gilberto Gil
 Idir
 Jace Everett
 Morten Harket
 Julien Jacob
 Shooter Jennings
 Tom Jobim
 Kevin Johansen
 Juanes
 K'naan
 Kando Bongo Man
 Lokua Kanza
 Salif Keita
 Khaled
 Angélique Kidjo
 Fela Anikulapo Kuti
 Femi Kuti
 Ladysmith Black Mambazo
 Nara Leao
 Linton Kwesi Johnson
 Ismael Lo
 Lo' Jo
 Baaba Maal
 Vusi Mahlasela
 Mahotella Queens
 Miriam Makeba
 Souad Massi
 Sérgio Mendes
 Pablo Milanés
 Rhett Miller
 Morley
 Mungal
 Nude Girls
 Orange Blossom
 Geoffrey Oryema
 Vanessa Paradis
 Pascal of Bollywood
 Perfume
 Pink Martini
 Randy Crawford & Joe Sample
 Elis Regina
 Sa Dingding
 Ivete Sangalo
 Seu Jorge
 Idrissa Soumaoro
 Kristi Stassinopoulou
 Rachid Taha
 Tiken Jah Fakoly
 Tinariwen
 Yerba Buena
 Zucchero

References

External links
 Official Web site

British record labels
Record labels established in 1998
World music record labels
British country music record labels